Vincent Martin (born 4 September 1992) is a French rugby union player who plays for Montpellier HR in the Top 14. His position is centre, although he can also play as a wing. In November 2012, he was named in the France 30-man squad for the 2012 autumn internationals by coach Philippe Saint-André.

References

1992 births
Living people
French rugby union players
Sportspeople from Avignon
RC Toulonnais players
Rugby union fullbacks
Rugby union wings